The third season of the woman prisoned themed television series Vis a Vis premiered on April 23, 2018 and ended on June 11, 2018 with a total of 8 episodes. After  Antena 3 cancelled the show, Fox Spain  picked up the series for a third and fourth season, with fourth as the last of the series.   

Since its cancellation, majority of the casts moved on to different projects, resulting to major cast changes in season three and four. Production also moved to  different filming location since the studio they used is already occupied by another Álex Pina show, Money Heist. Maggie Civantos, the series main character was reduced to a recurring role due to her commitment to her other show, Cable Girls. The show's other main cast lead by Najwa Nimri, Berta Vázquez, María Isabel Díaz Lago,  Marta Aledo, Laura Buena and Alba Flores, who also stars in Money Heist, returned as full time main cast members. 

The season revolved on the lives of the Saray (Alba Flores)  , Rizos (Berta Vázquez), Sole (María Isabel Díaz Lago), Tere (Marta Aledo), Anabel (Inma Cuevas), Antonia (Laura Baena) and Zulema Najwa Nimri as they adopt to the new environment of Cruz del Norte. After being transferred to the new prison due to over crowding in Cruz del Sur, the inmates were forced to unite and put aside their differences towards each other as they encounter inmates and prison officials of Cruz del Norte. As they arrived to their new home, they immediately felt the dark aura surrounding the place, with prison guards having actual guns waiting on their arrival. New characters were introduced such as a group of Chinese inmates who they immediately knew are the ones who are in control of the prison with Macarena (Maggie Civantos) as their first victim. 

The show and cast were nominated in several award giving bodies including a Best Actress nomination for Alba Flores and Best Director nominations for Jesus Colmenar, Sandra Gallego, David Molina Encinas, Jesus Rodrigo in  Premios Iris; Best Actress nominations for Najwa Nimri in Feroz Awards, Fotogramas de Plata, The Platino Awards for Iberoamerican Cinema and in Premios MiM among others.

Cast and characters

Cruz Del Norte Inmates 
Maggie Civantos as Macarena Ferreiro (Episodes 1-2)
Najwa Nimri as Zulema Zahir
Berta Vázquez as Estefania "Rizos" Kabila 
Alba Flores as Saray Vargas de Jesús 
Inma Cuevas as Ana Belén "Anabel" Villaroch Garcés (Episodes 1-4)
María Isabel Díaz Lago as Soledad "Sole" Núñez Hurtado
 Marta Aledo as  Teresa "Tere" González Largo
Laura Baena as Antonia Trujillo Díez 
Ruth Díaz as Mercedes Carrillo
 Huichi Chiu as Akame 
Ana Marzoa as Prudencia Mosqueira

Cruz del Norte Employees 
Javier Lara as Álex Moncada 
 Luis Callejo as Frutos
 Adriana Paz as Altagracia Guerrero

Police Force 
Jesús Castejón as Inspector Damián Castillo

Recurring Cast and Guests 
Itziar Castro as Goya Fernández 
Abril Zamora as Luna Garrido
Ramiro Blas as Dr. Sandoval
Irene Anula as Inspector Nerea Rojas 
Zaira Pérez as Nuria Millán
Carmen Baquero as Alba Vargas de Jesús 
Laura Quirós as Alicia González 
Raúl Tejón as Unai del Álamo
Ester Expósito as one of the daughters of Fernando

Episode List

Awards and nominations

References

2018 Spanish television seasons